Bellini and the Sphinx is 2001 Brazilian crime film directed by Roberto Santucci. Based on Tony Bellotto's homonymous novel, it stars Fabio Assunção as Remo Bellini, a São Paulo-based detective who investigates mysterious murders. It premiered at the 2001 Festival do Rio, where it won the award of Best Film.

It was followed by Bellini and the Devil, also starring Assunção, and directed by Marcelo Galvão.

Cast
Fábio Assunção as Remo Bellini
Malu Mader as Fátima
Maristane Dresch as Beatriz
Eliana Guttman as Dora Lobo
Paulo Hesse as dr. Rachid Rafidjian
Marcos Damigo as Samuel Rafidjian
Rosaly Papadopol as Sofia Rafidjian
Cláudio Gabriel as Stone

References

External links

2001 films
2000s crime films
Brazilian crime films
Brazilian detective films
Films based on Brazilian novels
Films directed by Roberto Santucci
Films set in São Paulo
Films shot in São Paulo
2000s Portuguese-language films